BattleTanx: Global Assault is an action game developed and published by The 3DO Company for the Nintendo 64 and PlayStation, in which players control futuristic tanks in a post-apocalyptic scenario. It is a sequel to the Nintendo 64 game BattleTanx, which utilized the same method of game play. Although it earned relatively positive reviews from critics, 3DO went bankrupt before another sequel could be released.

Gameplay

Players take control of different gangs, each using up to five different types of tanks. Most of the tanks can activate special abilities with the left and right C-buttons.

Multiplayer allows players to play in almost all of the maps from campaign mode, as well as some which are exclusive to multiplayer. The maps usually are based on known landmarks and locations in the United States or Europe, such as Route 66, the White House, the British Houses of Parliament, and the Eiffel Tower.

Plot
On January 13, 2006, the evil Queenlord Cassandra is spying on Griffin Spade's family and orders her troops to kidnap Griffin's son Brandon and kill everyone else. Griffin and his army manage to push back the invaders, but Cassandra soon turns the tables by mind-controlling Griffin's own army. Griffin and Madison manage to escape San Francisco and begin chasing Cassandra across the United States, eventually cornering her in Washington. Cassandra, however, escapes with Brandon to the United Kingdom; Griffin and Madison follow. They build a new army in Europe and chase her through England, France and Germany.

While in Paris, they discover Cassandra released the virus in 2001 to kill every woman on Earth who did not have the power of the Edge. In Berlin, Griffin finally rescues Brandon. They make it back to San Francisco and push back another invasion by the Storm Ravens, and finally corner and defeat Cassandra on Alcatraz Island. The story ends with a cliffhanger, as an unidentified magician finds Cassandra's body and speaks of a "chosen one" as he resurrects her.

Reception

The Nintendo 64 version received favorable reviews, while the PlayStation version received unfavorable reviews, according to the review aggregation website GameRankings. Doug Trueman of NextGen said of the former console version, "Players looking for mass destruction will enjoy this title, but gamers looking for more realistically paced action and strategy should wait until Tokyo Wars hits [the] Dreamcast" (which is non-existent, as there is no Dreamcast version of the arcade game-only Tokyo Wars).

Ash of GamePro said of the N64 version in its November 1999 issue, "One minor beef isn't enough to detract from the immense enjoyment of BattleTanx: Global Assault. After all, there are now seven new tanks to choose from – who cares how you control 'em – just pick a turret, any turret, hop in, and blow up stuff!" Five issues later, Jake the Snake said of the PlayStation version, "If you like fast action and blowing stuff up, BattleTanx: Global Assault offers [a] great... well, bang for your buck."

Notes

References

External links
 

1999 video games
Action video games
Multiplayer and single-player video games
Nintendo 64 games
PlayStation (console) games
Post-apocalyptic video games
Science fiction video games
Tank simulation video games
The 3DO Company games
Video games developed in the United States
Video games featuring female protagonists
Video games set in England
Video games set in Germany
Video games set in Paris
Video games set in Washington, D.C.
Dystopian video games